The 1921 Rice Owls football team was an American football team that represented Rice University as a member of the Southwest Conference (SWC) during the 1921 college football season. In its ninth season under head coach Philip Arbuckle, the team compiled a 4–4–1 record (1–2–1 against SWC opponents) and outscored opponents by a total of 144 to 128.

Schedule

References

Rice
Rice
Rice Owls football seasons
Rice Owls football